Searchlight on Harbor Entrance, Santiago de Cuba is an early 20th century painting by American artist Winslow Homer. It is currently (2018) in the collection of the Metropolitan Museum of Art.

Executed in oil on canvas from sketches made by Homer in 1895, the painting depicts two cannon atop Castillo de San Pedro de la Roca, also known as Morro castle, a Spanish built fortress on the island of Cuba. The fort played a role in the decisive Battle of Santiago de Cuba in 1898, in which the United States Navy destroyed a Spanish fleet sheltering there. The image was painted after the event received much publicity in 1901 as a court of enquiry strove to apportion credit to the American commanders involved.

The work is on view at the Metropolitan in Gallery 767.

See also
 1901 in art
 List of works by Frederic Edwin Church

References

1901 paintings
Paintings by Winslow Homer
Paintings in the collection of the Metropolitan Museum of Art
Military art